Vivanta is an Indian hotel chain established in September 2010. The brand is a part of the Indian Hotels Company Limited, a subsidiary of the TATA Group.

Introduction

The brand Vivanta was born as a part of The Indian Hotels Company Limited brand architecture exercise. With this the brand rolled over 19 of its hotels to the new brand. This brand architecture exercise was a part of their previous launch of The Gateway hotels, which is marketed as an upscale brand.

References

External links
 

Hotel chains in India
Taj Hotels Resorts and Palaces
Companies based in Mumbai
Indian companies established in 2010
Hospitality companies established in 2010
2010 establishments in Maharashtra